Jennifer Bain is a voice actress who worked for Blue Water Studios in Calgary, Alberta, Canada. She has voiced Rosamia Badam in Mobile Suit Zeta Gundam, including Mobile Suit Gundam: Gundam vs. Zeta Gundam and Android 18 in Dragon Ball GT. She also loaned her voice in the anime television series, D.I.C.E.

Roles
 Zoids: Chaotic Century as Lt. Harden
 Mobile Suit Zeta Gundam as Rosamia Badam
 Mobile Suit Gundam: Gundam vs. Zeta Gundam as Rosamia Badam
 Gregory Horror Show as Angel/Demon Dog
 Flame of Recca as Mikoto
 Dynasty Warriors: Gundam 2 as Rosamia Badam
 Dynasty Warriors: Gundam 3 as Rosamia Badam
 Dragonball as Mrs Brief
 Dragon Ball GT as Android 18 and Frieza
 D.I.C.E. as Mok

She is now a professional multi medium visual and performing artist focussed on acrylic painting and puppeteering.

External links

References

Living people
Canadian voice actresses
Year of birth missing (living people)
Place of birth missing (living people)